Mercedes-Benz has sold a number of automobiles with the "430" model name:
 1999 C208
 1999 CLK430
 1997-2005 W163
 1999 ML430 4.3 L V8
  W210
  E430
  S430

430